Gracepoint is an American crime drama television series created by Chris Chibnall. It is a remake of Chibnall's UK drama series Broadchurch, and stars that series' lead, David Tennant, along with Anna Gunn, as two detectives investigating the murder of a boy in a small, tightly knit coastal town.

The series premiered on October 2, 2014, on Fox. The network promoted the show's 10-episode run as a "limited series".

Cast

Main
 David Tennant as Detective Emmett Carver
 Anna Gunn as Detective Ellie Miller
 Michael Peña as Mark Solano, father of Danny Solano
 Virginia Kull as Beth Solano, mother of Danny Solano and wife of Mark Solano
 Nick Nolte as Jack Reinhold, kayak/bike rental shop owner and wildlife recorder
 Jacki Weaver as Susan Wright
 Josh Hamilton as Joe Miller, husband of Ellie Miller 
 Kevin Rankin as Paul Coates, priest of the local church
 Kevin Zegers as Owen Burke, Ellie's nephew and a reporter for the Gracepoint Journal
 Jessica Lucas as Renee Clemons, a reporter working at the San Francisco Globe
 Stephen Louis Grush as Vince Novik, Mark Solano's plumbing apprentice and best friend
 Madalyn Horcher as Chloe Solano, sister of Danny Solano and daughter of Mark and Beth Solano
 Sarah-Jane Potts as Gemma Fisher, owner of the Crestview Inn
 Jack Irvine as Tom Miller, son of Ellie Miller and classmate of Danny Solano
 Kendrick Sampson as Dean Iverson, boyfriend of Chloe Solano

Recurring
 Alisen Down as Kathy Eaton, editor of the Gracepoint Journal
 Adam Greydon Reid as Raymond Connelly, phone engineer
 Tom Butler as Chief of Detectives Terrence Morgan
 Darcy Laurie as Hugo Garcia, a crime scene investigator
 Nikolas Filipovic as Danny Solano
 Karyn Mott as Detective Angela Schulz

Episodes

Production 
It was announced in August 2013 at the Television Critics Association Summer Press Tour that American television network Fox would develop an American version of Broadchurch, a critically acclaimed British series that had successful broadcasts in both the UK on ITV and the U.S. on BBC America. Chris Chibnall wrote the premiere episode and was executive producer of the series. Production began in January 2014 for a spot in Fox's 2014 fall season. The American adaptation was retitled as Gracepoint. James Strong, director of the majority of the original series, directed several episodes of Fox's adaptation.

Fox executives specifically said Gracepoint would have a different ending from Broadchurch.

Casting 

On October 2, 2013, David Tennant was confirmed to be starring as Detective Emmett Carver. Tennant also stars in the U.K. crime drama Broadchurch, on which Gracepoint is based. On November 18, 2013, two more actors joined, with Anna Gunn as Detective Ellie Miller and Jacki Weaver as Susan Wright. On December 3, 2013 Kevin Rankin was cast as Paul Coates and Virginia Kull as Beth, Danny's mother. On December 16, 2013 Kevin Zegers joined the cast of the series; he will play the role of news reporter Owen Burke. On December 19, 2013, Michael Peña was added to the cast to portray Mark Latimer (renamed Solano), Danny's father.

On December 20, 2013, Josh Hamilton was cast as Joe Miller, Det. Ellie Miller’s husband. On December 23, 2013, Nick Nolte also joined the cast as Jack Reinhold. On January 15, 2014, Kendrick Sampson was cast as Dean Iverson. On January 16, 2014, Jack Irvine was added to the cast as Tom Miller, son of Ellie and Joe Miller, and Danny's best friend. On January 22, 2014, Madalyn Horcher was added to the cast as Chloe Latimer, daughter of Mark and Beth, sister of Danny. On January 23, 2014, Webster Talent tweeted that Darcy Laurie will play the role of Hugo Garcia. On February 12, 2014, Sarah-Jane Potts joined the cast as Gemma.

Filming 
Filming began on January 28, 2014, in Oak Bay, British Columbia. It was filmed until late-May 2014 in the nearby locations of Greater Victoria including the city of Victoria, British Columbia. The marketplace at Portside Marina in Sidney, British Columbia, Canada was portrayed as Gracepoint Police Headquarters while filming during the spring of 2014.  In one episode, Nils Jensen, the Mayor of Oak Bay, played himself.

Reception
The series has received mixed to positive reviews from critics, drawing unfavorable comparison to the original UK series.  On the review aggregator site Rotten Tomatoes, the series holds a 64% rating based on 59 reviews, with an average rating of 5.99/10. The consensus reads: "While it may suffer in comparison to its British predecessor Broadchurch, Gracepoint brings an engrossing, sophisticated, and stylish crime drama to network television with Anna Gunn as a commanding lead." On Metacritic, the show has a score of 62 out of 100, based on 29 critics, indicating "generally favorable reviews". Even so, lead actor David Tennant won at the 41st People's Choice Awards in 2015 for Favorite Actor In A New TV Series.

Broadcast
In the UK, Gracepoint aired on ITV Encore, a satellite-only channel owned by ITV, the channel that aired Broadchurch. It premiered on April 1, 2015 and was released on DVD in the UK in June 2015 from publisher Acorn Media UK. The series has been sold by Shine International to both Australia and Canada. It began airing on Foxtel in Australia on October 3, 2014, and Global TV in Canada on  October 2, 2014.

References

External links 
 
 

2014 American television series debuts
2014 American television series endings
2010s American crime drama television series
2010s American mystery television series
American television series based on British television series
Broadchurch
English-language television shows
Fox Broadcasting Company original programming
Television series by 20th Century Fox Television
Television shows filmed in Victoria, British Columbia